The women's 60 metres event  at the 1987 IAAF World Indoor Championships was held at the Hoosier Dome in Indianapolis on 6 and 7 March.

Medalists

Note: Angella Issajenko (CAN) originally won silver but was disqualified in 1989 after admitting long-term drug use.

Results

Heats
The first 2 of each heat (Q) and next 8 fastest (q) qualified for the semifinals.

Semifinals
First 4 of each semifinal (Q) qualified directly for the final.

Final

References

60
60 metres at the World Athletics Indoor Championships